The Kezi River, also marked as Kirzl River (克孜勒河) and Kirzlesu River (克孜勒苏河) on the map of People's Republic of China, is a river in Xinjiang Uygur Autonomous Region of China, located in Kizilsu Kyrgyz Autonomous Prefecture.

Kezi River originates from the Gora Kurumdy (Kurumdy I Summit) in Kyrgyzstan-Tajikistan border and enters Wuqia County in Xinjiang through the border at Simukhana Pass (斯木哈纳山口), which is the boundary between the Tianshan and Kunlun Mountains. The river flows 900 kilometers within China, with a drainage area of 15,100 square kilometers.

Kezi River is the largest river in the Kashgar water system. In China, the river flows from west to east through Wuqia County, Kizilsu Kyrgyz Autonomous Prefecture, Shufu County, Shule County, Kashgar City, Jiashi City, and Bachu County in Kashgar Prefecture, and finally meets the Yarkant River and joins the Tarim River basin.

The Kashi  segment  (Xinjiang)  of  Kezi  River  was  badly  polluted. In 2016, the control unit in the Kashgar Prefecture of the Kezi River was upgraded from worse than Grade V to Grade V.

References

Rivers of China
Rivers of Xinjiang